Charles Firth may refer to:
 Charles Firth (comedian), Australian comedian
 Charles Firth (coach), head coach of the Virginia Tech college football program
 Charles Firth (historian) (1857–1936), British historian
 Charles Firth (British Army officer) (1902–1991), British general